The 2012–13 New Jersey Devils season was the 39th season for the National Hockey League franchise that was established on June 11, 1974, and 31st season since the franchise relocated from Colorado prior to the 1982–83 NHL season. The regular season was reduced from its usual 82 games to 48 due to a lockout.

The defending Stanley Cup runners-up were eliminated from the playoff race after a 4–1 loss to the New York Rangers on April 21, 2013.

Off-season
Entering the off season, the Devils were faced with a major dilemma of having over ten unrestricted free agents, including captain Zach Parise. The Devils were able to resign goaltenders Martin Brodeur and Johan Hedberg, defenseman Bryce Salvador and several others, but lost Parise to the Minnesota Wild.

Pre-season
On July 19, the New Jersey Devils announced their 2012 pre-season schedule. The team would have played seven pre-season games, including a game against the New York Islanders at the Barclays Center in Brooklyn, but all pre-season games were eventually cancelled due to the lockout.

Regular season
On June 21, the New Jersey Devils announced their schedule for the 2012–13 regular season. Their regular season would have begun on October 12 at the Washington Capitals, and their home-opener would have taken place the following night against the Boston Bruins. The original schedule would have ended with a game at the New York Islanders on April 13. A new schedule would need to be released if the lockout is resolved. On April 15, the Devils lost 2–0 to the Toronto Maple Leafs, their 10th loss in a row (0–6–4), which was equal to the franchise loss record set in 1983–84.

For the second consecutive season, the Devils led the League in shorthanded goals scored, as they scored 11 shorthanded goals in the 48-game regular season. However, after a 4–1 loss to their Hudson rival, the New York Rangers, on April 21, the Devils were eliminated from the playoff race, despite making it to the Stanley Cup Finals the previous year against the eventual champions, the Los Angeles Kings. This was the first time a Stanley Cup finalist missed the playoffs the next season since 2007.

Standings

Schedule and results

Regular season

|- bgcolor="#ccffcc"
| 1 || January 19 || New Jersey || 2–1 || New York Islanders || W |||| 16,170 || 1–0–0 || 2
|- bgcolor="#ccffcc"
| 2 || January 22 || Philadelphia || 0–3  || New Jersey || W|| || 17,625 || 2–0–0 || 4
|- bgcolor="#ccffcc"
| 3 || January 25 || Washington || 2–3 || New Jersey ||W||  OT || 17,625 || 3–0–0 || 6
|- bgcolor="#ffffcc"
| 4 || January 27 || New Jersey || 3–4 || Montreal ||OTL|| OT || 21,273 || 3–0–1 || 7
|- bgcolor="#ffffcc"
| 5 || January 29 || New Jersey || 1–2 || Boston ||OTL|| SO || 17,565 || 3–0–2 || 8
|- bgcolor="#ffffcc"
| 6 || January 31 || New York Islanders || 5–4 || New Jersey ||OTL|| OT || 17,625 || 3–0–3 || 9
|-

|- bgcolor="#FF9999"
| 7 || February 2 || New Jersey || 1–5 || Pittsburgh ||L || || 18,635 || 3–1–3 || 9
|- bgcolor="#ccffcc"
| 8 || February 3 || New Jersey || 3–0 || New York Islanders || W|| || 11,558 || 4–1–3 || 11
|- bgcolor="#ccffcc"
| 9 || February 5 || New York Rangers || 1–3 || New Jersey || W|| || 17,625 || 5–1–3 || 13
|- bgcolor="#ccffcc"
| 10 || February 7 || Tampa Bay || 2–4 || New Jersey || W|| || 14,802 || 6–1–3 || 15
|- bgcolor="#ccffcc"
| 11 || February 9 || Pittsburgh || 1–3 || New Jersey || W|| || 17,625 || 7–1–3 || 17
|- bgcolor="#ccffcc"
| 12 || February 10 || New Jersey || 3–1 || Pittsburgh || W|| || 18,658 || 8–1–3 || 19
|- bgcolor="#FF9999"
| 13 || February 12 || Carolina || 4–2 || New Jersey ||L||  || 17,625 || 8–2–3 || 19
|- bgcolor="#ccffcc"
| 14 || February 15 || Philadelphia || 3–5 || New Jersey || W|| || 17,625 || 9–2–3 || 21
|- bgcolor="#FF9999"
| 15 || February 16 || New Jersey || 1–5 || New York Islanders ||  L|||| 15,488 || 9–3–3 || 21
|- bgcolor="#ffffcc"
| 16 || February 18 || Ottawa || 2–1 || New Jersey || OTL||SO || 17,625 || 9–3–4 || 22
|- bgcolor="#ccffcc"
| 17 || February 21 || New Jersey || 3–2 || Washington || W|| || 18,506 || 10–3–4 || 24
|- bgcolor="#FF9999"
| 18 || February 23 || New Jersey || 1–5 || Washington || L|| || 18,506 || 10–4–4 || 24
|- bgcolor="#FF9999"
| 19 || February 24 || Winnipeg || 4–2 || New Jersey ||L||  || 17,625 || 10–5–4 || 24
|- bgcolor="#FF9999"
| 20 || February 28 || New Jersey || 1–3 || Winnipeg ||  L|||| 15,004 || 10–6–4 || 24
|-

|- bgcolor="#ffffcc"
| 21 || March 2 || New Jersey || 3–4 || Buffalo ||OTL|| SO || 19,070 || 10–6–5 || 25
|- bgcolor="#FF9999"
| 22 || March 4 || New Jersey || 2–4 || Toronto || L|| || 19,435 || 10–7–5 || 25
|- bgcolor="#FF9999"
| 23 || March 5 || Tampa Bay || 5–2 || New Jersey ||L||  || 15,229 || 10–8–5 || 25
|- bgcolor="#ccffcc"
| 24 || March 7 || Buffalo || 2–3 || New Jersey || W||SO || 17,625 || 11–8–5 || 27
|- bgcolor="#FF9999"
| 25 || March 9 || New Jersey || 3–6 || Carolina ||L||  || 18,680 || 11–9–5 || 27
|- bgcolor="#ccffcc"
| 26 || March 10 || Winnipeg || 2–3 || New Jersey ||W|| SO || 17,625 || 12–9–5 || 29
|- bgcolor="#ccffcc"
| 27 || March 13 || Philadelphia || 2–5 || New Jersey || W|| || 17,625 || 13–9–5 || 31
|- bgcolor="#ffffcc"
| 28 || March 15 || New Jersey || 1–2 || Philadelphia ||OTL|| SO || 19,971 || 13–9–6 || 32
|- bgcolor="#FF9999"
| 29 || March 16 || Montreal || 2–1 || New Jersey ||L||  || 17,625 || 13–10–6 || 32
|- bgcolor="#FF9999"
| 30 || March 19 || New York Rangers || 3–2 || New Jersey ||L||  || 17,625 || 13–11–6 || 32
|- bgcolor="#ccffcc"
| 31 || March 21 || New Jersey || 4–1 || Carolina || W|| || 16,941 || 14–11–6 || 34
|- bgcolor="#ccffcc"
| 32 || March 23 || Florida || 1–2 || New Jersey || W|| || 17,625 || 15–11–6 || 36
|- bgcolor="#ffffcc"
| 33 || March 25 || New Jersey || 2–3 || Ottawa ||OTL|| SO || 18,902 || 15–11–7 || 37
|- bgcolor="#ffffcc"
| 34 || March 29 || New Jersey || 4–5 || Tampa Bay ||OTL|| SO || 19,204 || 15–11–8 || 38
|- bgcolor="#ffffcc"
| 35 || March 30 || New Jersey || 4–5 || Florida || OTL||OT || 18,138 || 15–11–9 || 39
|-

|- bgcolor="#FF9999"
| 36 || April 1 || New York Islanders || 3–1 || New Jersey ||L||  || 17,625 || 15–12–9 || 39
|- bgcolor="#FF9999"
| 37 || April 4 || New Jersey || 0–1 || Boston ||  L|||| 17,565 || 15–13–9 || 39
|- bgcolor="#FF9999"
| 38 || April 6 || Toronto || 2–1 || New Jersey ||L||  || 17,625 || 15–14–9 || 39
|- bgcolor="#ffffcc"
| 39 || April 7 || New Jersey || 2–3 || Buffalo ||OTL|| SO || 18,703 || 15–14–10 ||  40
|- bgcolor="#FF9999"
| 40 || April 10 || Boston || 5–4 || New Jersey ||L||  || 17,625 || 15–15–10 ||  40
|- bgcolor="#FF9999"
| 41 || April 12 || Ottawa || 2–0 || New Jersey || L|| || 16,099 || 15–16–10 || 40
|- bgcolor="#FF9999"
| 42 || April 15 || New Jersey || 0–2 || Toronto || L|| || 19,425 || 15–17–10 || 40
|- bgcolor="#ccffcc"
| 43 || April 18 || New Jersey || 3–0 || Philadelphia ||  W|||| 19,727 || 16–17–10 || 42
|- bgcolor="#ccffcc"
| 44 || April 20 || Florida || 2–6 || New Jersey || W|| || 16,018 || 17–17–10 || 44
|- bgcolor="#FF9999"
| 45 || April 21 || New Jersey || 1–4 || New York Rangers ||L||  || 17,200 || 17–18–10 || 44
|- bgcolor="#ccffcc"
| 46 || April 23 || Montreal || 2–3 || New Jersey || W|| || 15,219 || 18–18–10 || 46
|- bgcolor="#ccffcc"
| 47 || April 25 || Pittsburgh || 2–3 || New Jersey || W|| || 16122 || 19–18–10 || 48
|- bgcolor="#FF9999"
| 48 || April 27 || New Jersey || 0–4 || New York Rangers || L|| || 17,200 || 19–19–10 || 48
|-

|-
| Legend:

Player statistics
Final stats

Skaters

Goaltenders

†Denotes player spent time with another team before joining the Devils.  Stats reflect time with the Devils only.
‡Denotes player was traded mid-season.  Stats reflect time with the Devils only.
Bold/italics denotes franchise record

Notable achievements

Awards

Milestones

Transactions 
The Devils have been involved in the following transactions during the 2012–13 season.

Trades 

|}

Free agents signed

Free agents lost

Claimed via waivers

Lost via waivers

Player signings

Draft picks

The New Jersey Devils picks at the 2012 NHL Entry Draft in Pittsburgh, Pennsylvania. 

Draft notes 
 The Devils' fourth-round pick went to the Carolina Hurricanes as the result of a January 20, 2012, trade that sent Alexei Ponikarovsky to the Devils in exchange for Joe Sova and this pick.
 The Toronto Maple Leafs' fourth-round pick went to the New Jersey Devils as a result of an October 4, 2011, trade that sent Dave Steckel to the Maple Leafs in exchange for this pick.
 The Calgary Flames' fifth-round pick went to the New Jersey Devils as a result of a July 14, 2011, trade that sent Pierre-Luc Letourneau-Leblond to the Flames in exchange for this pick.
 The Devils' seventh-round pick went to the Anaheim Ducks as the result of a December 12, 2011, trade that sent Kurtis Foster and Timo Pielmeier to the Devils in exchange for Rod Pelley, Mark Fraser and this pick.

See also 
 2012–13 NHL season

References

New Jersey Devils seasons
New Jersey Devils
New Jersey Devils
New Jersey Devils
New Jersey Devils
21st century in Newark, New Jersey